Aliran Kepercayaan is an official cover term for various native religion in Indonesia. It also includes various, partly syncretic forms of mysticism of new religious movements in Indonesia, such as kebatinan, kejiwaan, and kerohanian. In the Indonesian language, it is also used for new religious movements in other parts of the world.

Characteristics
According to Caldarola, kepercayaan "is not an apt characterization of what the mystical groups have in common". The US State Department's states:

Recognition
The Indonesian Government recognizes the right to follow Aliran Kepercayaan, as long as its practitioners do not upset the public order or offend the sensitivities of the followers of the major religions.

Indonesia's Constitutional Court in November 2017 ruled that followers of faiths outside the 6 recognized religions are allowed to state "Kepercayaan kepada Tuhan YME in their national identity cards, as a 7th category for Aliran Kepercayaan after judicial review launched by followers of Marapu religion, the Parmalim, Hindu Kaharingan, and Sapta Darma.

Notes

References

Sources

External links
 Article on Indonesia People's Consultative Assembly (MPR)

Religion in Indonesia